Peter Benjamin Parker, also known by his alter ego Spider-Man, is a fictional superhero portrayed by Tobey Maguire that is based on the comic book character of the same name. He is the protagonist of Sam Raimi's Spider-Man film in 2002, its two sequels, video games, and an animated series designed to be set within that continuity (in which he is voiced by Neil Patrick Harris). This version of the character was followed by Andrew Garfield's portrayal in Marc Webb's The Amazing Spider-Man duology (2012–2014), with a further iteration being portrayed by Tom Holland set within the Marvel Cinematic Universe (MCU) (2016–present). Maguire reprised his role as a supporting character in the MCU film Spider-Man: No Way Home (2021), appearing as an older version of himself alongside his two successors' versions of the character. To distinguish himself from the two other versions of himself, he is nicknamed "Peter-Two" by them, referred to by Marvel's official website as the Friendly Neighborhood Spider-Man, and in the film's script as "Raimi-Verse Peter" and "Raimi-Verse Spider-Man" (in honor of Sam Raimi).

The narrative of Raimi's trilogy focuses on Peter Parker's growth from high school to college, and his troubled relationship with his childhood best friend Harry Osborn, as well as his relationship with Mary Jane Watson, Parker's childhood crush and girlfriend. The narrative follows his struggles with his dual life as a college student and young adult, often to the disappointment of his avuncular college teacher Dr. Curt Connors, as well as his job as a freelance photographer for the Daily Bugle, under the snarky and abrasive editor-in-chief J. Jonah Jameson, who despises Spider-Man and constantly prints defamatory articles about the vigilante. Parker's secret life leads to many encounters with various super-human criminals such as Green Goblin and Doctor Octopus who threaten the peace and lives of civilians in New York City.

Maguire was chosen by Raimi and was officially cast following his screen test, with acknowledging performances from his previous films. Maguire began his physical training for Spider-Man, and even sought to learn the typical movements of spiders in his spare time. Costume designer James Acheson began forming several concepts for Spider-Man's suit designs and claimed that the suit left Maguire feeling claustrophobic, preferring only to wear the suit if a scene did not require him to put on the mask. Maguire's portrayal of the character received largely positive responses from critics and fans alike, along with receiving praise from his live-action successors Andrew Garfield and Tom Holland. Since Maguire's appearance in Spider-Man: No Way Home, fans have launched a campaign for the cancelled Spider-Man 4 to be made. A number of video game adaptations were attributed to the character from Raimi's movies, alongside an animated series that was designed to be set within the trilogy's continuity.

Creation and conception

Execution

David Koepp is the original screenwriter of the character outside of many attempted scripts to bring to life a Spider-Man film. Maguire was cast as Peter in July 2000, having been Raimi's primary choice for the role after he saw The Cider House Rules. The studio was initially hesitant to cast some actors, as Leonardo DiCaprio, Freddie Prinze Jr., Jude Law, Chris O'Donnell, Chris Klein, Wes Bentley and Heath Ledger, while Jake Gyllenhaal (who almost replaced Maguire from his injuries, and later cast as Mysterio in Spider-Man: Far From Home) was considered for the role in the second film, who did not seem to fit the ranks of "adrenaline-pumping, tail-kicking titans," but Maguire managed to impress studio executives with his audition. The actor was signed for a deal in the range of $3 to $4 million with higher salary options for two sequels. Maguire was trained by a physical trainer, a yoga instructor, a martial arts expert, and a climbing expert, taking several months to improve his physique.

Following the success of the first film, 2003 saw disparaging scenes between lead actor Tobey Maguire and the executives of distributor company Sony, as Maguire was close to being released from his contract following a dispute between the pair. Maguire had finished filming a now multi nominated Oscar production in the form of Seabiscuit, and had complained of the physical strain during his last two films. Sony executives believed that this was merely "part of Maguire's negotiating tactics", as a last attempt to bargain for a more lucrative paycheck; a statement quickly dismissed by Maguire's publicist.

Remaining a constant in all the rewrites was the "organic web shooter" idea from the Cameron "scriptment." Raimi felt he would stretch the audience's suspension of disbelief too far to have Peter invent mechanical web shooters.

Following the release of the third installment of the series, and its subsequent success at the box office, the now billion dollar franchise had been put into disarray, after director Sam Raimi had become unhappy with the script of his planned Spider-Man 4, leaving the movie to fall past its projected May 2011 release date. Further details were released after a statement made by Raimi explaining "the studio and Marvel have a unique opportunity to take the franchise in a new direction, and I know they will do a terrific job". Later reports confirmed that both Maguire and Raimi had left their respective roles. Sony proceeded with a reboot of the series titled The Amazing Spider-Man, starring Andrew Garfield as Peter Parker. The reboot was released in the United States on July 3, 2012.

In December 2017, Phil Lord and Christopher Miller said that an adult Peter Parker / Spider-Man would appear in the 2018 animated feature film Spider-Man: Into the Spider-Verse as a mentor to Miles Morales. In February 2019, Maguire was confirmed to have been considered to be cast to reprise his role from the Sam Raimi Spider-Man trilogy, but the idea was dropped so as not to confuse the audience with the concept of the "Spider-Verse", with Jake Johnson cast in his place in April 2018; despite this, references throughout the film and an archival recording of Cliff Robertson as Uncle Ben from Spider-Man 2 are used to indicate Johnson's portrayal of Parker to still be the same incarnation as Maguire's.

Following the release of The Amazing Spider-Man 2, after Garfield was allegedly let go of the role of Spider-Man according to documents released in the aftermath of the 2014 Sony Pictures hack, leaked information from the hack indicated Sony to have previously been in talks with Sam Raimi to have him direct Spider-Man vs. The Amazing Spider-Man, a multiversal crossover film featuring Garfield's Spider-Man encounter Tobey Maguire's Spider-Man (with Maguire reprising his role), as well as a new film trilogy starring Maguire (following Garfield's firing) as a middle-aged Spider-Man; and to also be in talks with Marvel Studios about integrating a rebooted version of Spider-Man into the Marvel Cinematic Universe (MCU), beginning with Captain America: Civil War (2016), a deal was reached in early 2015 between the two studios to make the latter official, effectively cancelling The Amazing Spider-Man franchise.

Despite both reboots of the Spider-Man film series, Maguire reprises his role in Spider-Man: No Way Home (2021), a film set in the MCU, appearing alongside Garfield's iteration of the character as a supporting character to the new MCU iteration of Spider-Man played by Tom Holland. It was reported in 2020 that Maguire would reprise his role as his version of Peter Parker alongside the other cinematic iterations of the character in the third MCU Spider-Man film; however, these reports were never confirmed by Sony or Marvel Studios and publicly denied by both Holland and Garfield several times prior to the film's release.

Design 

Although Spider-Mans suit wound up being faithful to the Spider-Man comics, many designs were made. One concept that costume designer James Acheson became fond of was the idea of having a red emblem over a black costume. Another, which would eventually lead to the final product, featured an enlarged logo on the chest and red stripes going down the sides of the legs. To create Spider-Man's costume, Maguire was fitted for the skintight suit, being covered with layers of substance to create the suit's shape. It was designed as a single piece, including the mask. A hard shell was worn underneath the mask to make the shape of the head look better and to keep the mask tight while keeping the wearer comfortable.  For scenes where he would take off his mask, an alternate suit where the mask was a separate piece was made. The webbing, which accented the costume, was cut by computer. The mask's eye-lenses were designed to have a mirror look. Dykstra said the biggest difficulty of creating Spider-Man was that as the character was masked, it immediately lost a lot of characterization. Without the context of eyes or mouth, a lot of body language had to be put in so that there would be emotional content. Raimi wanted to convey the essence of Spider-Man as being "the transition that occurs between him being a young man going through puberty and being a superhero." Dykstra said his crew of animators had never reached such a level of sophistication until giving subtle hints of making Spider-Man feel like a human being. When two studio executives were shown shots of the computer-generated character, they believed it was actually Maguire performing stunts.

Costume designer James Acheson made numerous subtle changes to Spider-Man's costume in Spider-Man 2, although keeping the design relatively the same. The colors were made richer and bolder. The spider emblem was given more elegant lines and enlarged, the eye-lenses were somewhat smaller, and the muscle suit underneath was made into pieces, to give a better sense of movement. The helmet Maguire wore under his mask was also improved, with better movement for the false jaw and magnetic eyepieces, which were easier to remove.

In Spider-Man 3, Peter has two variations of his suit: his traditional one and one colored in black that forms due to an alien symbiote bonding to him. The symbiote suit worn in the comics by Spider-Man was a plain black affair with a large white spider on the front and back. Initially, the design for the symbiote suit for the film was made of latex and looked more faithful to the one in the comics, but it was rejected by the producers. The final design was changed for the film to become a black version of Spider-Man's traditional costume, complete with webbing motif. It also had a slightly different spider symbol. As a consequence of this, the suit Topher Grace wore as Venom also bore the webbing motif; as producer Grant Curtis noted, "it's the Spider-Man suit, but twisted and mangled in its own right." Additionally, the motif gave a sense of life to the symbiote, giving it the appearance of gripping onto the character's body.

Themes and analysis

The first film characterizes Peter Parker as an intelligent, bookish, and level-headed yet lonely and isolated teenager, focusing on his personality as a shy and bashful outsider before he gains his powers and subsequent struggles of deciding between using his newfound abilities for personal gain or for the betterment of others. By overcoming these struggles, Peter uses his abilities to help people after his uncle Ben is killed by a robber during a robbery, for which Peter was indirectly responsible. Inspired by Ben's last words, Peter is motivated to use his super-human abilities for a more noble cause under the persona of a masked vigilante: "Spider-Man". However, even after taking up the persona of Spider-Man, Peter still retains his socially-inept, awkward and dorky, yet endearingly good-hearted nature, and develops a sarcastic and witty sense of humor in his Spider-Man guise. Peter deals with all his personal struggles, all while wrestling with his feelings for his childhood crush and close friend Mary Jane Watson and handling his close relationship with his best friend Harry Osborn.

In Spider-Man 2, director Sam Raimi felt that the film had to thematically explore Peter's internal conflict with his personal wants against his responsibility, the positives and negatives of his chosen path, and how he ultimately decides that he can be happy as a heroic figure. Raimi stated the story was partly influenced by Superman II, which also explored the titular hero giving up his responsibilities. The sequel's story is mainly taken from the comic book series The Amazing Spider-Man No. 50, "Spider-Man No More!" According to Raimi, Peter Parker's story is about "a life out of balance". Peter is caught between a life where he tries to help people and atone for his uncle's death with his Spider-Man alter-ego and another where he tries to balance his studies, occupation as a photographer and his relationship with his family and friends. Peter acknowledges that he cannot be with Mary Jane without endangering her, due to his Spider-Man alter-ego; fearing that if his enemies would ever find out about his true identity, they would target his loved ones. As a result, Peter distances himself from Mary Jane, but eventually rekindles his relationship with her after she finds out about his dual life, and struggles he has faced.

In Spider-Man 3, Raimi intended to further develop Peter's character with the planned film focusing on Peter learning that he is not a sinless vigilante and that there can also be humanity in those he considers criminals, especially as the Venom symbiote brings out the darker aspects of Peter's personality upon bonding with him. Raimi himself quoted: "The most important thing Peter right now has to learn is that this whole concept of him as the avenger or him as the hero, he wears this red and blue outfit, with each criminal he brings to justice he's trying to pay down this debt of guilt he feels about the death of Uncle Ben. He considers himself a hero and a sinless person versus these villains that he nabs. We felt it would be a great thing for him to learn a little less black and white view of life and that he's not above these people." Raimi based his ideas out of the original comic books.

Appearances

Spider-Man trilogy

Spider-Man (2002)

Peter is introduced as a 17-year-old shy, bespectacled outsider at Midtown High School in New York City with a longtime crush on his neighbor Mary Jane Watson. Prior to a school field trip to Columbia University, Peter meets up with his best friend Harry Osborn, who introduces him to his father Norman, the CEO of Oscorp whom Peter idolizes. As Peter, Harry, Mary Jane, and their classmates tour a genetics laboratory at the university, Mary Jane notes one of 15 genetically modified super-spiders in an exhibit missing. The spider in question drops onto Peter as he takes a picture of MJ for the school newspaper and bites him. Peter falls ill upon returning home and passes out in his room.

The next morning, Peter finds he is no longer near-sighted and that his body is now at peak physical condition. He also discovers he has developed spider-like superpowers, which allow him to avoid injury during a confrontation with rival and bully Flash Thompson, Mary Jane's ex-boyfriend, and Peter knocks Flash out with one punch, though he later apologizes to Mary Jane for the confrontation. After noticing Flash's new car, Peter considers impressing Mary Jane with his own car. Brushing off his Uncle Ben's advice that "with great power comes great responsibility", he enters an underground wrestling tournament to raise the money and wins his first match, but the promoter cheats him of his earnings. When a robber suddenly robs the promoter's office, Peter allows him to escape. Moments later, he discovers Ben was carjacked and killed with a pistol. Enraged, Peter pursues and confronts the carjacker, only to realize it was the robber he let escape. After Peter disarms him, the carjacker flees but dies after falling out a window.

Upon graduating, Peter, finally taking Ben's words to heart out of guilt, begins using his abilities to fight crime, donning a costume and the person of Spider-Man. This does not impress J. Jonah Jameson, publisher of the Daily Bugle newspaper, and he begins a smear campaign against the wall-crawler. Jameson hires Peter as a freelance photographer, as Peter is the only person providing clear images of Spider-Man. Peter moves into an apartment with Harry paid for by Norman upon starting college. He keeps his identity as Spider-Man secret from Harry, who likewise keeps his dating relationship with Mary Jane, who had broken up with Flash, a secret from Peter until she reveals it to him.

Peter is assigned by Jameson to take pictures at the World Unity Fair, which Mary Jane and Harry attend together with the Oscorp board of directors. Suddenly, the Green Goblin, who is actually Norman with a crazed second personality, attacks the fair and assassinates the board of directors, endangering Mary Jane and Harry. Peter changes into his Spider-Man suit, saving several civilians from the Goblin before rescuing Mary Jane after she falls from a balcony. The Goblin takes note of Spider-Man and proposes a truce to work together. When Spider-Man later refuses, the two fight in a burning building, leaving Spider-Man with a cut on his arm.

During Thanksgiving dinner with Peter, his Aunt May, MJ, and Harry, Norman notices the cut on Peter's arm and deduces his secret identity as Spider-Man. He later attacks and hospitalizes May in an attempt to "go after [Peter]'s heart". While visiting Peter and May at the hospital, Mary Jane admits to Peter she is infatuated with Spider-Man, who saved her once again from thugs in an alley, and she asks Peter if Spider-Man had ever asked about her. As Peter indirectly reveals his feelings for her, Harry walks in on the two as they are holding hands. Devastated, Harry confides in his father that Mary Jane loves Peter, inadvertently revealing Spider-Man's true weakness. The Goblin kidnaps MJ and holds her and a Roosevelt Island Tramway car full of children hostage along the Queensboro Bridge, forcing Spider-Man to choose whom to save before dropping them. Peter saves both with assistance from a tugboat as the Goblin is jeered by the civilians who side with Spider-Man.

The Goblin grabs Peter, throws him into an abandoned building, and brutally beats him. When Goblin boasts about how he will later kill Mary Jane, an enraged Peter overpowers Goblin. Norman reveals himself to Peter by taking off his helmet and begs for mercy, trying to reason that his Goblin personality made him commit crime, but covertly controls the jet glider to stab Peter. Warned by his spider-sense, Peter dodges the attack, and the glider fatally impales Norman instead. With his dying breath, Norman asks Peter not to reveal his identity as the Green Goblin to Harry. Peter returns Norman's body to the Osborn house and hides the Goblin's suit and equipment, but Harry arrives to find him standing over his father's body. Harry seizes a gun, intent on shooting Spider-Man, but he escapes.

At Norman's funeral, Harry swears vengeance toward Spider-Man, whom he deems responsible for his father's death, and asserts that Peter is all the family he has left. Mary Jane confesses to Peter she is in love with him. Peter, however, feels he must protect her from the unwanted attention of his enemies, so he hides his true feelings and tells Mary Jane that they can only be friends. As Peter leaves the funeral, he recalls Ben's words and accepts his responsibility as Spider-Man.

Spider-Man 2 (2004)

Two years later, Peter struggles to maintain his personal life while serving as Spider-Man, getting fired from a second job he takes as a pizza delivery boy while also struggling with his studies at Columbia University and finances. He is also growing distant from his two friends, Harry and Mary Jane, who have found success as the new CEO of Oscorp and a Broadway actress, respectively, and discovers Aunt May is facing foreclosure of her home after his surprise birthday party.

Harry introduces Peter to his idol Dr. Otto Octavius, whose research Oscorp is funding, prior to a demonstration of Octavius' work on fusion power. During the demonstration, Octavius dons a harness with four robotic arms and artificial intelligence. Despite a successful start, the demonstration becomes unstable. Octavius ignores Harry's demands to shut it off while Peter dons his suit to unplug it, but not before the resulting explosion kills Octavius' wife and assistant Rosalie and fuses the harness to his spine, also destroying the inhibitor chip that keeps Octavius in control of the arms.

As Peter and May go to a bank to argue against her foreclosure, Octavius, now increasingly influenced by the arms and dubbed "Doctor Octopus" or "Doc Ock" by Jameson, robs the bank in an attempt to finance a second attempt at his experiment. Peter dons his suit again and takes on Doc Ock as he holds May hostage. Spider-Man manages to rescue May despite letting Doc Ock flee with the money. After discovering that Mary Jane is getting engaged to Jameson's son John and getting into a fight with a drunken Harry during a party, Peter suffers an emotional breakdown over his inability to balance his life, losing his powers as a result. He decides to give up being Spider-Man after consulting with a doctor, throwing away his suit, which a garbage man discovers and sends to Jameson.

Peter begins to succeed in his studies and turn his life around, beginning to mend his friendship with Mary Jane. He also reveals to Aunt May his role in inadvertently causing Uncle Ben's death, though May forgives him after initial shock. While Peter helps May move out of her home, she advises him about the hope Spider-Man gives to the people in spite of the sacrifices he must make. This encourages Peter to attempt a comeback as Spider-Man due to increased crime in New York, though his powers remain lost.

Octavius visits Harry and threatens him to give him the isotope tritium. Harry agrees in exchange for Spider-Man, and tells Octavius to seek Peter, who Harry believes is friends with Spider-Man, but tells Octavius not to harm him. As Mary Jane invites Peter to a café to discuss whether or not he loves her, Octavius locates Peter, tells him to find Spider-Man, and captures Mary Jane. Her endangerment leads to Peter's powers resurrecting. As Jameson admits that he was wrong about Spider-Man, Peter steals his suit back from the Bugle and goes after Octavius. As Peter battles Octavius, they fall onto a New York City Subway train. Octavius sabotages the controls and leaves Peter to save the passengers, which he does at a great physical toll. When he faints from exhaustion, the grateful passengers save him from falling and bring him into the train, seeing his unmasked face but promising to keep their knowledge hidden. They unsuccessfully try to protect him when Octavius returns to capture Peter, whom Octavius delivers to Harry.

After giving Octavius the tritium, Harry prepares to kill Spider-Man, only to be shocked to see Peter under the mask. Peter convinces Harry to direct him to Octavius' lair, as bigger things are at stake. As Peter arrives at the doctor's waterfront laboratory and attempts to rescue Mary Jane discreetly, Octavius discovers him, and they battle as the nuclear reaction swells and starts threatening the city. Peter ultimately subdues Octavius, reveals his identity, and persuades Octavius to let his dream go for the greater good. Octavius commands the tentacles to obey him, and gives his life to destroy the experiment. Mary Jane sees Peter's true identity and feelings, which he says is why they cannot be together. Peter returns Mary Jane to John and leaves. However, Mary Jane leaves John at the altar during their wedding and runs to Peter's apartment, declaring she is willing to accept any risks that come with being in a relationship with Peter. The two finally become a couple, and Mary Jane sees Peter off as he swings into action as Spider-Man to assist emergency services.

Spider-Man 3 (2007)

A year and a half later, Peter finally finds stability and success in both his personal life and exploits as Spider-Man. He and Mary Jane are happily dating, and after attending her performance in a new play, he spends time with her at Central Park. A meteor lands nearby and a goo-like alien symbiote oozes out and attaches itself to Peter's moped. After sending Mary Jane home, he talks to Aunt May, who gives him the engagement ring given to her by Uncle Ben, about proposing to MJ. On his way home, Peter is ambushed by Harry, who has utilized his father's equipment and Goblin serum and intends on avenging Norman's death, despite Peter mentioning the truth of Norman's demise. An aerial chase ensues, resulting in Harry getting knocked out cold when Peter sets a trap for him. Having suffered amnesia and forgotten his vendetta against Spider-Man, Harry wakes up in the emergency room, re-embracing Peter and Mary Jane as his best friends.

Mary Jane is upset by a negative review of her performance, and Peter unsuccessfully tries to relate to her using his experience as Spider-Man. She later neglects to inform him when she loses her role in the play. At work at the Daily Bugle, Peter finds that a rival freelance photographer, Eddie Brock, has also begun taking pictures of Spider-Man and Jameson pits the two photographers against each other for a staff job. He later finds out about a ceremony in which Spider-Man would be given the key to the city for rescuing Gwen Stacy, the daughter of NYPD commissioner George Stacy and also Peter's college lab partner. Peter, who dons his suit and persona for the ceremony, basks in the crowd's cheers and gives Gwen an upside-down kiss reminiscent of his first kiss with Mary Jane. This upsets Mary Jane, leading to an argument with Peter, who postpones his plans to propose to her.

Peter also encounters Flint Marko, also known as "Sandman". Upon discovering that Marko was the one who fatally shot Ben, not the carjacker as previously believed, Peter develops a vendetta against Marko and upon falling asleep while listening to police radio, the symbiote oozes out from Peter's closet and bonds with his suit, turning it black. Empowered by the new suit's abilities and with his anger amplified, Peter dons it while confronting Marko in the subway tunnels, leading to Marko's apparent demise when a deluge of water reduces him to mud. When Peter tells May about Marko's apparent death at Spider-Man's hands, she is not amused and warns him about the adverse effects of revenge.

Meanwhile, Harry regains his memory and vendetta after experiencing a flood of emotions triggered by spending time with Mary Jane. Experiencing another vision of his father, who entices him to attack Peter's heart, Harry blackmails Mary Jane into breaking up with Peter and claiming she had "fallen in love with another man". Harry claims to Peter he is the "other man", enraging Peter, who later confronts Harry at his penthouse wearing the black suit underneath. The former friends engage in a brutal fistfight and Peter emerges on top, insulting Harry by mocking his relationship with his father. Harry throws a pumpkin bomb in a last-ditch attack on Peter, who effortlessly slings the bomb back at Harry's face and leaves.

Peter thwarts an attempt by Eddie to claim the job at the Bugle, leading to Brock's dismissal and subsequent falling out with Gwen, whom he was dating at the time. Peter then gains the job with his own picture of Spider-Man, and under influence from the symbiote, begins to act more arrogantly. He takes Gwen to a jazz club where Mary Jane had taken up work and interrupts her performance with his own dance routine. Gwen catches onto Peter's true intentions and leaves, and the resulting fight with the club's bouncers results in Peter inadvertently hitting Mary Jane when she intervenes. Coming to his senses after he sees a horrified MJ, Peter leaves and gets rid of the symbiote suit by utilizing church bells to stun the symbiote. The symbiote falls onto and bonds with Brock, who, unbeknownst to Peter, is at the church praying for God to kill him. This creates a new enemy, Venom, as Brock now knows Spider-Man's secret identity.

After May visits Peter encouraging him not to give up on Mary Jane, Venom and Sandman join forces against Spider-Man, kidnapping Mary Jane and dangling her from a skyscraper construction site to get Peter's attention. Peter pleads with Harry to help him, but a broken-spirited Harry, whose face was disfigured from the bomb, declines. Peter encounters Venom in his regular suit and tries to free Mary Jane but is ambushed by Sandman. As Peter is savagely beaten by Sandman, Harry, who had discovered the truth of his father's death, arrives in his New Goblin persona to aid his old friend. Peter and Harry form a formidable tandem, defeating Sandman and rescuing Mary Jane, but face difficulty in subduing Venom, who attempts to stab Peter with Harry's glider, but Harry takes the blade for Peter. Remembering the symbiote's weakness to sound, Peter weakens Venom by creating sonic frequencies and pulls Eddie out from the symbiote, preparing to destroy it with a bomb, but Eddie jumps back to the symbiote and is killed with it when the bomb explodes.

Marko re-emerges behind Peter and explains that Ben's death was an accident rooted in a desperate attempt to save his terminally-ill daughter's life and that it has haunted him since. Peter forgives Marko and allows him to escape. He swings down to a mortally-wounded Harry, who is tended to by Mary Jane. Peter and Harry forgive each other and reaffirm their friendship before Harry dies from his injuries. Peter and Mary Jane attend Harry's funeral with several others and later begin to repair their relationship.

Marvel Cinematic Universe

Spider-Man: No Way Home (2021)

Many years later, Peter (dubbed "Peter-Two" during the events of the film) is accidentally transported to Earth-616 due to Doctor Strange's interrupted attempt to cast a spell and restore the secret identity of that universe's Peter Parker (dubbed "Peter-One") after it was exposed by Mysterio. Unbeknownst to Peter, his universe's Norman, Octavius, and Marko were also transported into this universe, among other villains. While there, Peter finds another version of himself transported from another universe (dubbed "Peter-Three") who helps him console Peter-One after the death of his Aunt May, who was killed by Norman’s Goblin persona. Peter mentions that he lost Uncle Ben and regretted pursuing the man he thought killed him, warning Peter-One that killing Goblin will not help him cope with May's death, but Peter-One was averse to listen. Peter also mentions to Peter-Three that his relationship with Mary Jane became complicated after the death of his best friend Harry, but they eventually made it work after a long time.

Peter and the alternate Peters agree to save the villains by developing cures for them, then draw the villains towards the Statue of Liberty. During the skirmish, Peter fights Connors and Dillon, cures Marko and happily reunites with an already-cured Octavius who steps in to help the three Peters. Peter witnesses Peter-One attempting to kill Goblin, and stops him from doing so. Goblin then stabs Peter in the back, though he survives, as the alternate Peters eradicate the crazed Goblin persona of Norman with an anti-serum that Peter had developed for his old friend, curing the latter for good. After all of the villains are defeated and cured, Peter says goodbye to his alternate selves, as he, Peter-Three, and their villains are returned to their home universes.

Comic appearances

Marvel tie-in comics
This version of Peter appears in the comics Spider-Man 3: Movie Prequel and Spider-Man 3: The Black, which the latter expands the birth of Venom after Peter rejects the symbiote.

Mainstream continuity
Although he does not physically appear, this version of Parker is referenced in the Marvel Comics event Spider-Verse which featured many interpretations of the character from many different media. Tobey Maguire's Spider-Man is mentioned as resembling "the guy from Seabiscuit", a film which Maguire also stars in.

In other media

Television

 After the success of Raimi's first film, a CGI animated series/spin-off was released in 2003, starring Neil Patrick Harris as the titular protagonist. This series served as a loose alternate continuation to the first Spider-Man film and was considerably darker, grittier, adult-oriented, and mature in tone and direction, compared to other Spider-Man adaptations. It received a generally positive reception from critics and audiences.
The animated series The Spectacular Spider-Man (2008–09) homaged various visual and storytelling elements from Raimi's films and their iteration of the character. The show's co-creator Greg Weisman, commented that the production team elected to use a more minimalist art style for the series' world and characters so that it would particularly benefit the likes of Spider-Man himself, who would then be able to animate fluidly while in motion and mimic many movements present in Raimi's incarnation of the character. He stated, "The movies raised the bar on the thrill of Spider-Man swinging through the city. So we wanted our cartoon to capture that, which meant we wanted the style to be very iconic, but it had to be clean enough that the animators could really make these characters move without the lines running all over the place." There are various references in the show to key moments with the film trilogy's version of Parker, such as a shot of Peter landing on the subway in an identical pose to when he initially confronted Doctor Octopus on the moving train in Spider-Man 2, in addition to stopping a stolen truck from colliding with an oncoming pedestrian by using his webbing to restrict movement, in a similar manner to how Raimi's Parker stopped the active subway in said film, as well as Sandman reconciling with Peter and vanishing in thin air, emulating Peter and Marko's final moments together in Spider-Man 3. The Daily Bugle also appears early in the series, with Parker seeking to work there in order to pay for the increase in Aunt May's debt to their residence; the building is modelled after the real-life Flatiron Building as it was previously depicted in the Sam Raimi films and the comics limited series Marvels.

Film

Prior to Sony's 2015 decision to collaborate with Marvel Studios and reboot the character of Spider-Man within the Marvel Cinematic Universe, Sony reportedly considered  the option of doing a crossover film between  Maguire's Spider-Man and the version of the character played by Andrew Garfield in The Amazing Spider-Man series with Sam Raimi reportedly asked to direct it. Sony also reportedly considered reviving the Raimi series outright following the critical and financial disappointment of the Webb/Garfield The Amazing Spider-Man 2 but this idea was ultimately not pursued by Sony.
Both versions of Peter Parker who appear in Sony Pictures Animation's 2018 CGI film Spider-Man: Into the Spider-Verse take inspiration from this incarnation of Spider-Man, continuing their storyline onwards from the events of Sam Raimi's Spider-Man trilogy. The older Peter Parker, voiced by Jake Johnson, is meant to evoke an older, more cynical version of Tobey Maguire's portrayal, outright referencing several iconic moments from these films as across his career and is generally down on his luck, while the younger Peter Parker from Miles Morales' dimension, voiced by Chris Pine, who undergoes identical escapades but is far more fortunate and successful in life, including a happy marriage with Mary Jane, while the older Peter also had this marriage, but reluctantly ended up divorced due to feeling unfit to be a father because of his risky calling, a concept originally conceived of for the unmade Spider-Man 4.
An unused scene involving a cameo consisting of Tobey Maguire, Andrew Garfield and Tom Holland, voicing their respective Spider-Men in the film was removed due to "being too convoluted".
 Maguire's "Webbed" suit from the video game Spider-Man (2018) appears in a deleted scene of Sony's Spider-Man Universe film Morbius (2022) as a graffiti, used as a reference to the ending of Spider-Man: Far From Home (2019).

Video games

 The video game adaptations of Spider-Man, Spider-Man 2, and Spider-Man 3 all feature Tobey Maguire reprising his role as Parker in a vocal capacity. The trilogy of video games found their existence through a collaborative effort between (at the time) small-time video game publisher Activision and developer Treyarch. The first and second installments were met with favorable reviews by a large consumer base, earned upon each of their respective releases, with 2004's Spider-Man 2 garnering great success upon its arrival "with the PlayStation 2 version becoming the seventh-best-selling title of the year in the U.S.". The third installment of the video game trilogy did not live to the expectations of its predecessors, much like its film counterpart, as the game was met with lackluster reviews, leaving much to be desired about the title, although the Nintendo DS version received more positive reviews.
 The Spider symbol from Spider-Man 2 is used on Spider-Man's chest in Marvel: Ultimate Alliance and Marvel: Ultimate Alliance 2.
 This version of Peter Parker appears in Spider-Man: Friend or Foe, voiced by James Arnold Taylor. In an alternate timeline where all of his villains survived their original deaths, Spider-Man is recruited by S.H.I.E.L.D. director Nick Fury to travel to different locations around the world to recover shards from the meteor the Venom symbiote arrived in, before they fall into the wrong hands. Along the way, he faces old and new enemies who have been placed under mind-control, and subsequently teams up with them, as well as with other heroes.
 Parker's suit from the trilogy is available as a bonus suit as part of the Rhino Challenge Pack DLC in The Amazing Spider-Man film game. The black suit from Spider-Man 3 is also available in-game and is unlocked if certain requirements are met, or can be immediately unlocked by taking photos of hidden spider graffiti in the city.
 Parker's suit from the trilogy is available as an alternate costume named the "Webbed Suit" to the Spider-Man (2018) video game.

Reception

Fans and critics 

Maguire's portrayal of the character has received a largely positive critical reception. The actor's performance and portrayal of Spider-Man, along with Sam Raimi's characterization of the character, was subject to much of the praise towards Sam Raimi's Spider-Man film trilogy; being cited as true to the Spider-Man mythos as through capturing the socially-inept, endearingly awkward and nerdy aspects of the character's personality, along with his witty sense of humor and cheesy one-liners, underlying humanity, internal conflicts, relatability and struggles with his dual alter-ego and his normal life, praising the well-rounded, character-driven and faithful take on the titular character. The Hollywood Reporter placed Maguire's portrayal of Spider-Man as the tenth greatest superhero film portrayal of all time. Entertainment Weekly placed him as the tenth coolest hero of all time. Andrew Garfield, his successor to the role has described Maguire as "my Spider-Man hero".

Nick Philpott of Comic Book Resources placed Maguire's version as the 4th best take on Spider-Man, this being lower than both Andrew Garfield's and Tom Holland's take on the web-slinger, opining that he has the effect of the comic book version despite being too old for the role of the character. The Hollywood Reporter thought Maguire's portrayal of Spider-Man had less wit than his comicbook counterpart, but still praised him for his sincere, depthful portrayal of the more flawed, human side of the character. Several have shown polarized responses to Maguire's acting when he is possessed by the Venom symbiote in Spider-Man 3, particularly a scene in which he dances that has been described as "infamous". The possessed Peter has been nicknamed "Emo Peter" or "Bully Maguire" by fans and his scenes have become a popular internet meme.

Accolades

Future

#MakeRaimiSpiderMan4 movement
Maguire's appearance in No Way Home was met with a highly positive reception from both fans and critics. Subsequently, a fan campaign using the hashtag #MakeRaimiSpiderMan4 began on Twitter advocating for Sony to produce a fourth film in the Spider-Man series, with Maguire and Dunst reprising their roles along with Sam Raimi directing.

See also
 Spider-Man in film

Notes

References

External links
 
Friendly Neighborhood Spider-Man on the Marvel Cinematic Universe Wiki

Alternative versions of Spider-Man
Characters created by David Koepp
Characters created by Sam Raimi
Fictional characters from Queens, New York
Fictional characters with precognition
Fictional characters with superhuman durability or invulnerability
Fictional characters with superhuman senses
Fictional college students
Fictional photographers
Fictional vigilantes
Film and television memes
Film characters introduced in 2002
Internet memes
Male characters in film
Marvel Cinematic Universe characters
Marvel Comics American superheroes
Marvel Comics characters with accelerated healing
Marvel Comics characters with superhuman strength
Orphan characters in film
Spider-Man (2002 film series)
Spider-Man film characters
Spider-Man in other media
Superheroes who are adopted
Superheroes with alter egos
Teenage characters in film
Teenage superheroes